Aquabacterium fontiphilum is a Gram-negative non-spore-forming, motile bacterium of the genus Aquabacterium in the family Comamonadaceae, which was isolated from a water sample from the Nature Valley in Hsinchu County in Taiwan. Aquabacterium fontiphilum has a single polar flagellum and its colonies are semitransparent.

References

External links
Type strain of Aquabacterium fontiphilum at BacDive -  the Bacterial Diversity Metadatabase

Comamonadaceae
Bacteria described in 2009